Oxus valley may refer to: 
 Oxus river
 The Oxus civilization known as the Bactria-Margiana Archaeological Complex